Gaya Lok Sabha constituency is one of the 40 Lok Sabha (parliamentary) constituencies in Bihar state in eastern India.

Assembly segments
Presently, Gaya Lok Sabha constituency comprises the following six Vidhan Sabha (legislative assembly) segments:

Members of Parliament
The following is the list of the Members of Parliament elected from this Lok Sabha constituency:

Election results

General elections 2019

General elections 2014

See also
 Gaya district
 List of Constituencies of the Lok Sabha

References

External links
Gaya lok sabha  constituency election 2019 date and schedule

Lok Sabha constituencies in Bihar
Politics of Gaya district